Ajit Singh Gill (born 21 March 1928) was a Singaporean field hockey player. He competed in the men's tournament at the 1956 Summer Olympics.

References

External links
 
 

1928 births
Living people
Singaporean male field hockey players
Olympic field hockey players of Singapore
Field hockey players at the 1956 Summer Olympics
Sportspeople from Kuala Lumpur
Malaysian sportspeople of Indian descent
Malaysian people of Punjabi descent
Malaysian emigrants to Singapore
Singaporean sportspeople of Indian descent
Singaporean people of Punjabi descent